Francis Henry Biehl (23 May 1890 – 19 July 1964) was an Australian rules footballer who played with South Melbourne in the Victorian Football League (VFL).

Notes

External links 

1890 births
1964 deaths
Australian rules footballers from Melbourne
Sydney Swans players
People from Clifton Hill, Victoria